Kazem Sarikhani (5 April 1978 – 10 October 2013) was an Iranian judoka. He competed in the Men's 81 kg event at the 2000 Summer Olympics.

References

1978 births
2013 deaths
Iranian male judoka
Olympic judoka of Iran
Judoka at the 2000 Summer Olympics
Place of birth missing
Asian Games bronze medalists for Iran
Asian Games medalists in judo
Judoka at the 1998 Asian Games
Judoka at the 2002 Asian Games
Medalists at the 1998 Asian Games